HYPER JAPAN is the largest exhibition celebrating Japanese culture to be held in the UK. Organized by Cross Media Ltd., it was first held in London 2010 and since 2014 has taken place twice a year, in July and November. It takes place in Olympia, London

Overview
Centred on Japanese cuisine and popular culture such as gaming, manga, anime and music, the event introduces a wide range of Japanese culture, encompassing technology, fashion, traditional crafts. The venue is divided into three main areas; the stage area, the exhibition area and the experience area. The summer and winter events have different themes. The theme of the summer event is a festival of popular culture, while the winter event is a shopping and merchandising event centred around Christmas shopping. 

HYPER JAPAN was developed in 2010, the brainchild of Cross Media Ltd.’s President and Representative Director Mr. Kazuhiro Marumo, as a fusion of Japanese cuisine, which is increasingly popular in the UK, and Japanese pop culture, which was already booming across Europe. In this sense it is different from the many pop culture events that are currently held around the world by local fan communities.

History

From the first event in 2010 to the fifth event in 2013, HYPER JAPAN was staged irregularly, roughly once every nine months.  Since 2014, it has been held twice a year, with a summer event in July and a Christmas event in winter. Since 2015, the summer event has taken place the week after the Japan Expo in Paris, and the Christmas event is the last weekend in November, which coincides with Black Friday.

Venues

As the event has grown in scale, it has moved to larger venues around London. In 2017, it took place in Tobacco Dock in the east of the city.

Partners

From the first event until the present, the Tokyo head office of the  has been an official event partner, and has provided back-up for exhibitors coming from Japan. In 2014, which is home to model Kyary Pamyu Pamyu, joined as an official partner, and HYPER KAWAii was staged as a sub-event as a collaboration between HYPER JAPAN and HARAJUKU KAWAii. 

Japanese cuisine

A number of sub-events are organized as part of the event, all allowing visitors to vote for their favourite food and drink. The Sushi Awards aim to find the best sushi in the UK, the Sake Experience gathers together ten Japanese sake brewers with the aim of finding the UK’s favourite sake and the Sake Cocktail awards determines the nation’s favourite sake cocktail. The Japanese Ministry of Agriculture, Forestry and Fisheries has also participated on numerous occasions, holding cookery demonstrations, tasting corners, stage shows etc. to drive publicity of Japanese cuisine and ingredients. Many Japanese food manufacturers also take part by taking exhibitor stands and doing cookery demonstrations.

Gaming, anime, manga and cinema

Many UK-based exhibitors sell a range of anime-related goods, figurines, comics etc. A number of Japanese companies have exhibited, including Nintendo, Bandai Namco, Square Enix, Konami, Toei Animation, Kodansha Europe and Niconico. Since the first event, there has been a Cosplay show participated in by UK-based fans, and for a time the UK heat of the World Cosplay Summit was held at the event. Many guest speakers from Japan have also appeared, including anime producer Mitsuhisa Ishikawa, director Naoyoshi Shiotani, writer , voice artist Takashi Kondo and film director Satoshi Miki. Commenting just after his appearance, Mitsuhisa Ishikawa said, “I had thought that the UK was a conservative country, and may not appreciate the kind of edgy works we were creating, but I really feel that truly great work can transcend national boundaries. I really get the impression that Japanese culture is appreciated, so I hope that this kind of event will continue in the future.”

Musical performances

Some performances have been live-streamed in Japan courtesy of Niconico.

Fashion

As well as a merchandise area, there is always a kawaii fashion show for fans to take part in. In the past, a fashion show has also been held as a collaboration between model Misako Aoki and shironuri artist MINORI. At HYPER JAPAN 2011, a UK Kawaii Star of the Year contest was held, which featured musician Kanon Wakeshima as a guest judge.

Technology

Japanese technology company ITK, which is best known for its handroid robotic hand, has appeared every year since 2011, either on stage or in a booth, showcasing their very latest technology. At HYPER JAPAN 2014 there was a guest appearance by Tomotaka Takahashi, who developed Kirobo, the world’s first robotic astronaut, where he demonstrated his creation.

Traditional arts

In addition to sales of kimono, Japanese accessories and other traditional craft products and workshops, there are performances of martial arts, buyō (Japanese dancing), shamisen playing, tea ceremony, flower arranging and other traditional Japanese crafts. There is also an exhibition of bonsai by the Federation of British Bonsai Societies, which has previously been awarded a Gold Medal at the Royal Horticultural Society’s Chelsea Flower Show. In 2013, there was a guest appearance by the Australian geisha Sayuki (real name: Fiona Graham) who was the first ever non-Japanese geisha. Together with other geisha from her house she provided a behind the scenes view of a geisha house, including dressing, make-up and practising. 

Tourism and regional promotion

Besides governmental bodies such as the JNTO, CLAIR and the Tokyo Convention and Visitors’ Bureau, UK-based travel agents specialising in trips to Japan also participate from time to time. In addition, representatives from Okinawa Prefecture, Fukuoka City, Shizuoka City, Nantan City and others have attended for reasons of regional promotion.

Charity

HYPER JAPAN 2011 was held to help reconstruction in the aftermath of the Tōhoku earthquake and tsunami, under the banner of Genki Giving. Donation money was raised via the earthquake exhibition section, charity raffle and workshops. The organizers also donated a portion of the sponsorship and ticket revenue from that event to the Tohoku Earthquake Relief Fund organized by the Japan Society.

Events

References

External links 
 

Japanese culture
2010 establishments in the United Kingdom
Japan–United Kingdom relations
Annual events in the United Kingdom